Michael Dana Gioia (born December 24, 1950) is an American poet, literary critic, literary translator, and essayist.

Since the early 1980s, Gioia has been considered part of the literary movements within American poetry known as New Formalism, which advocates the continued writing of poetry in rhyme and meter, and New Narrative, which advocates the telling of non-autobiographical stories. Gioia has also argued in favor of a return to the past tradition of poetry translators replicating the rhythm and verse structure of the original poem.

Gioia helped renew the popularity  of Henry Wadsworth Longfellow and the rediscovery of  John Allan Wyeth. He also co-founded the annual West Chester University Poetry Conference, which has run annually since 1995.

At the request of U.S. President George W. Bush, Gioia served between 2003 and 2009 as the chairman of the National Endowment for the Arts (NEA). In November 2006, Business Week magazine profiled Gioia as "The Man Who Saved the NEA". Five years after Gioia left office, The Washington Post referred to him as one of "two of the NEA's strongest leaders".

Gioia is the Judge Widney Professor of Poetry and Public Culture at the University of Southern California and a Senior Fellow at the Trinity Forum. In December 2015, he became the California State Poet Laureate.

Gioia has published five books of poetry and three volumes of literary criticism as well as opera libretti, song cycles, translations, and over two dozen literary anthologies. Gioia's poetry has been anthologized in The Norton Anthology of Poetry, The Oxford Book of American Poetry, and several other anthologies. His poetry has been translated into French, German, Italian, Spanish, Russian, Romanian, Bulgarian, Chinese, and Arabic. Gioia published translations of poets such as Eugenio Montale and Seneca the Younger.

Background and early life
In his cowboy poem, The Ballad of Jesus Ortiz, Gioia describes how his maternal great-grandfather, Jesus "Jake" Ortiz, a Mexican immigrant from Sonora, worked as a cow-puncher in the Old West before settling down, getting married, and working as a saloon keeper in Lost Cabin, Wyoming. The poem climaxes with Ortiz's murder by a disgruntled and racist cowboy  around 1910. At the end of the poem, Gioia describes how his widowed great-grandmother watched Gioia's grandfather and great-uncle ride away to become cowboys themselves in order to support the family. Gioia first heard the story from his grandfather as a ten-year-old child and later confirmed it with the assistance of the Wyoming State Librarian.

Michael Dana Gioia was born in Hawthorne, California. His father, Michael Gioia, was a Sicilian immigrant who worked as a cab driver and later as a chauffeur. Gioia's "tightly knit Sicilian family" lived together in the same triplex, spoke to each other almost exclusively in Sicilian dialect, and, "rarely socialized with anyone who wasn't related". His mother, Dorothy Ortiz, worked as an operator for the phone company. Ortiz had been, "born in Hawthorne of mainly Mexican stock", but, "had to become more Italian than the Italians to fit in." In a 2019 interview, Gioia described his maternal grandfather as, "a hard-drinking and temperamental man", and explained that Dorothy Ortiz, "left home in her mid-teens to escape his violent outbursts." Gioia's younger brother is jazz and blues historian Ted Gioia.

In 1956, after Gioia's maternal uncle, "an old-style proletarian intellectual", former member of the American Communist Party, and Catholic convert named Theodore Ortiz, died in an airplane crash, Dorothy Ortiz Gioia inherited her brother's, "exceptional library of books and records." Gioia recalled, "So I grew up in a house filled with books in five or six different languages, musical scores, art books, and recordings. Even though my parents took no interest in these things, they kept them out of a sense of family duty. This extraordinary library had a marked influence on my life." Gioia has described the working class Los Angeles of his childhood, as completely removed from Hollywood, "glitz and glamor", and instead, "quite old fashioned, very European, and deeply Catholic. No, 'European' is the wrong word. Very Latin. The Sicilians blended very well into the existing Mexican culture."

On June 17, 2007, while giving a now iconic commencement address at Stanford University, Gioia quipped, "Although I have two degrees from Stanford, I still feel a bit like an interloper on this exquisitely beautiful campus. A person never really escapes his or her childhood. At heart I'm still a working-class kid — half Italian, half Mexican — from L.A., or more precisely from Hawthorne, a city that most of this audience knows only as the setting of Quentin Tarantino's Pulp Fiction and Jackie Brown — two films that capture the ineffable charm of my hometown."

Education

Parochial school
Gioia attended parochial school at St. Joseph's Church in Hawthorne. He has expressed gratitude for the classical education, rooted in both medieval scholasticism and renaissance humanism, which he received there from the Sisters of Providence of Saint Mary-of-the-Woods and which continued at Junipero Serra High School in Gardena. Gioia recalls, "In my Catholic high school the Marianist brothers drilled us relentlessly in Latin and theology. We worked our way through most of St. Augustine and St. Thomas Aquinas's arguments. We also read Horace, Catullus, Virgil, and Ovid." Despite the bawdiness of their content, the curriculum of the Marianist Brothers also used the Medieval Latin poetry of the Goliards as a further means of instruction.

Gioia credits the classical education he received with enabling him to become the first person in his family to go to college.

University education
In 1969, Gioia received a scholarship to study music at Stanford University. At Stanford, Gioia experienced the culture shock, "of meeting the children of America's ruling class. It took me years to sort out my own reactions." Gioia recalls, that he, "was simultaneously impressed and repelled," by fellow students from wealthy families. Gioia also recalls, "I was also naively astonished by how little their education meant to them."

He later recalled, "I came to Stanford planning to be a composer. After a short time with the Stanford Music Department, however, my passion for music was frustrated. I wanted to compose tonal music, but my teachers believed that tonality was a dead tradition." Owing to his frustration, Gioia arranged to spend his sophomore year studying classical music and the German language and literature in Vienna. He later recalls that it was during his stay in Austria that he decided to become a poet.

While attending Harvard University at the beginning of the fall term in 1974, Gioia's, "unfashionable interest in prosody", inspired him to sign up for the English class, "The History of English Versification", taught by Robert Fitzgerald. At the same time, "the need to work up my Latin for the doctoral language exams", caused Gioia to also sign up for an advance course in Roman poetry, which Gioia soon dropped in favor of a comparative literature course on narrative poetry, which was also taught by Robert Fitzgerald.

Gioia later wrote about both classes, "The surface of the poem, Fitzgerald's method implied, was the poem. No epic survived the welter of history unless both its language and story were unforgettable. From a plot, posterity demands immediate pleasure and enduring significance. An epic narrative must vividly and unforgettably embody the central values of a civilization — be they military valor or spiritual redemption. Only a few poets at a few fortunate points in history had met this challenge successfully. To understand the full value of these poems, Fitzgerald insisted, one not only needed to study the cultures and literary traditions that created them. One also needed to test them against life. The ultimate measure of Homer, Virgil, and Dante's greatness was that their poems taught one about life, and that life, in turn, illuminated them."
 
In 1975, during his last term at Harvard, Gioia signed up for an English class titled, "Studies in Modern Poetry", taught by poet Elizabeth Bishop. Gioia has described the experience of taking the class as instrumental in his future literary and personal development.

Bishop believed, in opposition to the New Criticism, that, "One did not interpret poetry, one experienced it. Showing us how to experience it clearly, intensely, and above all, directly, was the substance of her teaching. One did not need a sophisticated theory. One needed only intelligence, intuition, and a good dictionary. There was no subtext, only the text. A painter among Platonists, she preferred observation to analysis, and poems to poetry."

Gioia graduated from Harvard with a master's degree in 1975, and a Master of Business Administration from Stanford Business School in 1977. As both a graduate and undergraduate, Gioia was editor of Stanford's literary journal the Sequoia Magazine.

Writing and business career

Gioia joined General Foods in 1977, where he eventually became vice president of marketing. He was on the team that invented Jell-O Jigglers and is credited with helping reverse a long-running sales decline for Jello. While working at General Foods, Gioia wrote in the evenings, producing several volumes of poetry and literary translations.  In an interview with William Baer, Gioia recalled that he chose, while working at General Foods, to conceal his simultaneous authorship of both poetry and literary criticism. He explained, "I felt it wouldn't do me any good in the business world to be known as a poet."

In 1984, Gioia was called by Esquire Magazine and told that he would be included in their inaugural list of Men and Women Under 40 Who are Changing the Nation. Gioia recalls, "When Esquire called to say that they were planning to write an article about me, I tried to discourage them. But they made clear that my own wishes had nothing to do with it since they intended to run the article anyway. Most people at General Foods were pretty shocked, especially my boss, who was an Annapolis graduate who'd been an all-American in two sports and a commanding officer in combat... So when he heard the rumor that I wrote poetry, he called me into his office, and he asked me if it was true. When I reluctantly conceded that it was, his only response was, 'Shit.' ... By that time, I was already recognized as a valuable senior executive at General Foods, but I have to admit that being known as a poet didn't make my life any easier."

The Poetry Wars 
At the same time that Esquire ran the article, a dispute was beginning to erupt in American poetry between free verse poets and those, like Gioia, who also wrote and published in traditional verse forms. Over time, the dispute would be dubbed the Poetry Wars by literary critics.

When the Poetry Wars began, poets who wrote free verse and confessional poetry were stereotyped as socially progressive, anti-racist, and as New Left socialists. New Formalist and New Narrative poets were stereotyped as old money White Anglo-Saxon Protestant preppies and as Anglophiles filled with hatred of the American Revolution and nostalgia for the British Empire. American poetry in traditional verse forms was, according to poets and critics who believed in "The Free Verse Revolution", reactionary, Eurocentric, un-American, white supremacist, and even fascist.

In a 2016 interview, Gioia recalled, "As soon as I began publishing formal poems, my work was attacked." In response, he decided, "to articulate my poetics", by publishing literary essays.

Gioia wrote the 1983 essay Business and Poetry, in which he pointed out how many other well-known figures in American poetry, including Wallace Stevens, T. S. Eliot, and William Carlos Williams, had also made their livings outside of the academy.

Gioia agrees with the New Formalist poets, who believe that American poetry needs to return to rhyme, regular rhythm, more traditional practices of literary translation, and with the New Narrative poets' rejection of confessional poetry in favor of telling non-autobiographical stories. Otherwise, Gioia has argued since the early 1980s, American poetry will never again regain the popularity currently held by fiction writing. Like many other poets, however, Gioia writes in both free and formal verse and is a particular proponent of accentual verse.

In a 2021 interview, Gioia said that while New Formalism and the New Narrative are by far the most controversial responses within American poetry to the dominant position of free verse and confessional poetry, they are only one facet of an enormous grassroots movement. According to Gioia, "If I go back to 1975 when I was leaving Harvard, I was told by the world experts in poetry that rhyme and meter were dead, narrative was dead in poetry. Poetry would become ever more complex, which meant that it could only appeal to an elite audience, and finally, that the African American voice in poetry rejected these European things and would take this experimental form. What the intellectuals in the United States did was we took poetry away from common people. We took rhyme away, we took narrative away, we took the ballad away, and the common people reinvented it. The greatest one of these was Kool Herc in the South Bronx, who invented what we now think of as rap and hip hop. Within about ten years, it went from non-existent to being the most widely purchased form of popular music. We saw in our own lifetime something akin to Homer, the reinvention of popular oral poetry. There were parallels in the revival of slam poetry, cowboy poetry, and new formalism, so at every little social group, people from the ground up reinvented poetry because the intellectuals had taken it away from them."

The term New Formalism was first used in Ariel Dawson's article The Yuppie Poet in the May 1985 issue of the AWP Newsletter, which was an attack against the growing trend of returning to traditional verse forms.

According to Gerry Cambridge, "Dawson's polemic conflated the increasing prevalence of Formalism with lifestyle, with 'the glorification of competitiveness and the compulsion to acquire,' possessed, she asserted, by 'the yuppie poet.' She also accused New Formalism simply of being old Formalism, as practiced by Anthony Hecht and Richard Wilbur, rehashed. Bizarrely, she opposed a concern with technique against 'artistic integrity.' Apparently, she judged them to be enemies of each other rather than complimentary."

In 1986, Diane Wakoski, a poet, literary critic, and professor at Michigan State University, published the essay "The New Conservatism in American Poetry". The essay was provoked when Wakoski attended a Modern Language Association conference in which old Formalist John Hollander spoke critically, according to Robert McPhillips, of college and university, "creative writing programs and the general slackness of most free verse."

In what Gerry Cambridge has called, "a rambling and confused attack," Wakoski said of Hollander's remarks, "I thought that I heard the Devil speaking to me." Hollander was, Wakoski alleged, "a man full of spite, from lack of recognition and thinly disguised anger... who was frustrated and petty from that frustration," as he was, "denouncing the free verse revolution, denouncing the poetry which is the fulfillment of the Whitman heritage, making defensive jokes about the ill-educated, slovenly writers of poetry who have been teaching college poetry classes for the past decade, allowing their students to write drivel and go out into the world, illiterate of poetry." Wakoski then turned her attack against the younger poets, whom she called, "really the spokesmen for the new conservatism," which she called an unfortunate continuation of the legacies of Henry Wadsworth Longfellow, T. S. Eliot, and Robert Frost.

According to Robert McPhillips, "Wakoski's critique of these poets is less aesthetic than it is political. She actually believes that those who use traditional forms could only be supporters of Reagan's conservative agenda. But her overtly moral denunciation and generalized invective marked a turning point in contemporary poetics. Her excesses created a backlash from writers and critics who were more disinterested in their reading of the poets Wakoski so zealously condemned. As a result of the public controversy, some poets began to see themselves as part of the loose movement that would be identified as the New Formalism."

Accord to Gerry Cambridge, "This attack generated five responses, from Robert Mezey, Lewis Turco, David Radavich, Brian Richards, and Dana Gioia. Most of them denied any necessary link between aesthetic and politics, in particular between form and conservatism, citing Ezra Pound as an example of a Fascist who wrote free verse. They also criticized as a kind of cultural fascism Wakoski's intolerance of literary pluralism, paradoxically in the guise of a democratic Whitmanism that declared form to be un-American. Gioia compared her tone and content to 'the quest for pure Germanic culture led by the late Joseph Goebbels.' He entertainingly suggested 'the radical notion' that whatever poetry was written by Americans constituted American poetry. Wakoski's polemic and these responses were the first public controversy about the young movement."

In 1986, Robert McPhillips witnessed a debate between Gioia and John Hollander over, "whether poetry was initially an oral or a written art." Gioia argued that poetry was originally oral, while Hollander argued that it was originally written.

McPhillips later recalled, "In retrospect, I realize that I heard on that occasion part of what was to become a tenet of the New Formalism often articulated by Gioia: that poetry was first and foremost an oral form and rhyme and meter central elements of oral poetry; that these virtues were considered outmoded by a generation of free verse poets; and that these were poetic virtues that – along with narrative – Gioia and others of his generation saw as vital elements necessary to be restored to poetry if it hoped to reestablish something like the mainstream audience still enjoyed by serious writers of fiction like Oates, John Updike, Philip Roth, Toni Morrison, and Jane Smiley."

In his influential 1987 essay Notes on the New Formalism, Gioia wrote: "Literature not only changes; it must change to keep its force and vitality. There will always be groups advocating new types of poetry, some of it genuine, just as there will always be conservative opposing forces trying to maintain the conventional methods. But the revival of rhyme and meter among some young poets creates an unprecedented situation in American poetry. The New Formalists put the free-verse poets in the ironic and unprepared position of being the status quo. Free verse, the creation of an older literary revolution, is now the long-established, ruling orthodoxy, formal poetry the unexpected challenge... Form, we are told authoritatively, is artificial, elitist, retrogressive, right-wing, and (my favorite) Un-American. None of these arguments can withstand critical scrutiny, but nevertheless, they continue to be made so regularly that one can only assume that they provide some emotional comfort to their advocates. Obviously, for many writers the discussion between formal and free-verse has become an encoded political debate."

Despite persuasive arguments against political stereotyping of formalist poets by Progressive poet-critics Paul Lake in the 1988 essay, Towards a Liberal Poetics, Annie Finch in the anthologies A Formal Feeling Comes (1994), which states in the introduction, ""Readers who have been following the discussion of the 'New Formalism' over the last decade may not expect to find such a diversity of writers . . . the poems collected here contradict the popular assumption that formal poetics correspond to reactionary politics and elitist aesthetics,"  and After New Formalism (1999), and A. E. Stallings in the 2010 essay Afro-Formalism, The Poetry Wars between poets and critics from both literary movements are still raging decades later in literary journals, in colleges and universities, and on the internet. Furthermore, Diane Wakoski's claims continue to be repeated.

In a 2016 interview with John Cusatis, however, Dana Gioia explained, "Literary movements are always temporary. They last a decade or so, and then they die or merge into the mainstream. The best New Formalist poets gradually became mainstream figures. There was no climax to the so-called Poetry Wars, only slow assimilation and change. Free and formal verse gradually ceased to be considered polar opposites. Form became one of the available styles of contemporary practice. Today one finds poems in rhyme and meter in most literary magazines. New Formalism became so successful that it no longer needed to exist."

Can Poetry Matter? 

In 1991, Gioia published the influential essay, Can Poetry Matter? in the April issue of Atlantic Monthly. In the essay, Gioia began with the words, "American poetry now belongs to a subculture. No longer part of the mainstream of artistic and intellectual life, it has become the specialized occupation of a relatively small and isolated group. Little of the frenetic activity it generates ever reaches outside that closed group. As a class, poets are not without cultural status. Like priests in a town of agnostics, they still command a certain residual prestige. But as individual artists, they are almost invisible."

The reason, Gioia explained, was that between 1940s and the 1960s, when college and university faculty positions were routinely offered to famous poets, American poetry had become imprisoned in college and university creative writing programs. As a result, recent poetry was no longer being read or studied by the vast majority of the American people. He alleged that, to say that a living poet was well-known, meant merely that he or she was well known to other poets, who were generally professors and graduate students. He further wrote that poetry was no longer a fruit of Literary Bohemia, but of academic bureaucracy.

Gioia concluded with the words, "The history of art tells the same story over and over. As art forms develop, they establish forms that guide creation, performance, instruction, and analysis. But, eventually, these conventions grow stale. They begin to stand between the art and its audience. Although much wonderful poetry is being written, the American poetry establishment is locked into a series of outmoded conventions – outmoded ways of presenting, dissecting, and teaching poetry. Educational institutions have codified them into a stifling bureaucratic etiquette that enervates the art. These conventions may once have made sense, but today they imprison poetry in an intellectual ghetto. It is time to experiment, time to leave the well-ordered but stuffy classroom, time to restore a vulgar vitality to poetry and unleash the energy now trapped in the subculture. There is nothing to lose. Society has already told us that poetry is dead. Let's build a funeral pyre out of the desiccated conventions piled around us and watch the unkillable Phoenix rise from the ashes."

Writing in 2002, Gioia recalled, "When the original essay appeared in the April 1991 issue of Atlantic Monthly, the editors warned me to expect angry letters from interested parties. When the hate mail arrived typed on the letterheads of University writing programs, no one was surprised. What astonished the Atlantic editors, however, was the sheer size and intensity of the response. Can Poetry Matter? eventually generated more mail than any article the Atlantic had published in decades. The letters arrived in three familiar varieties – favorable, unfavorable, and incomprehensible. What was unusual was that they were overwhelmingly positive. Hundreds of people wrote – often at great length – to express their agreement, frequently adding that the article had not gone far enough in criticizing certain trends on contemporary poetry. The responses came from a great cross section of readers – teachers, soldiers, lawyers, librarians, nuns, diplomats, housewives, business executives, ranchers, and reporters – mostly people who were not then normally heard in the poetry world. As their testimonies demonstrated, they cared passionately for the art but felt isolated and disenfranchised from the official academic culture of poetry. An outsider myself, who worked in an office during the day and wrote at night, I felt a deep kinship with their situation. I probably learned more from those readers than they learned from me. Their comments provided clear and candid insight on the place poetry still occupied in the lives of many Americans. For me, the response to Can Poetry Matter? will always reside in those individual letters, which have never entirely stopped coming."

In 1992, Gioia resigned from his position as a vice president at General Foods to pursue a full-time career as a poet.

Fulltime writer

Founding the West Chester Conference
Since 1995, West Chester University has held an annual poetry conference co-founded by Gioia with a special focus on traditional prosody and New Formalism.

In an interview with William Baer, Gioia recalled how he and fellow poet Michael Peich came up with the idea for the conference. They were having dinner at the home of Gioia's parents in Sebastopol, California, when they both realized, "that although there were, at that time, over 2,000 writers' conferences in the United States – several of which I was involved in – there was not a single place where. a young writer could go to learn the traditional craft of poetry in any systematic way. Having just finished a bottle of Pinot Noir, it occurred to us that it would be a wonderful thing to start such a conference. So we did, even though we had no budget, no staff, and no other visible means of support.

"We drew up what we thought would be a model curriculum – classes in meter, the sonnet, the French Forms, narrative poetry, etc. – and next to each subject, we put the name of the person we thought would be the best younger poet to teach that course. We felt that it was important that these techniques be taught as living traditions by younger writers who were actively using them. We also wanted to honor our elders, and so we decided to recognize, as keynote speaker, some writer who we felt confident had an enduring place in the canon of American letters. We invited Richard Wilbur to be our first keynote speaker. We had no money to pay our faculty, so I called each of them up to explain why it was important that we all do this, and everyone said, 'yes.'

"Initially, we thought that the conference would probably be a one time only thing, but when it was over, nobody went home. People stuck around because they'd enjoyed themselves so much, and we realized that we should do it again."

Since 1995, the West Chester Conference has expanded its classes to included such subjects as blank verse and dramatic monologue.

Every year at the West Chester University Poetry Conference, the Robert Fitzgerald Prosody Award is awarded, "for a lifetime contribution to the study of versification and prosody."

NEA chairman

In 2002, Gioia was nominated as Chairman of the National Endowment for the Arts by U.S. President George W. Bush. Gioia served as chairman from 2003 to 2009, and worked to bring new visibility to the agency through a series of national initiatives that stressed broad democratic reach and artistic excellence.

With wide support from both Democrats and Republicans in the U.S. House of Representatives, Gioia gained a $20.1 million increase in his agency's budget and for the remainder of his tenure, silenced the perpetual requests from Libertarians to abolish the NEA. In November 2006, Business Week magazine profiled Gioia as "The Man Who Saved the NEA".

While Chairman, Gioia created several national initiatives each around a specific art. "We have a generation of Americans growing up who have never been to the theater, the symphony, opera, dance, who have never heard fine jazz, and who increasingly don't read," said Gioia, in justifying his efforts to bring large scale national initiatives of artistic excellence to millions of Americans. The New York Times columnist William Safire referred to Gioia's NEA national initiatives as "A Gioia to Behold". His program "Shakespeare in American Communities" gave grants to more than 40 American theatre companies to tour small and medium-sized communities. His program The Big Read aimed to increase literacy across America. Based on the "one city, one book" concept, The Big Read brought together partner organizations across the country to encourage entire communities to read the same book. It was launched as a pilot program with ten communities in 2006, and went national in 2007, eventually becoming the largest literary program in the history of the federal government.

In 2006, Gioia created Poetry Out Loud, a national poetry recitation contest for students. Each year, some 375,000 students participate, beginning at the high school classroom level. Classroom winners advance to school-wide recitation competitions, and school champions advance to regional and state competitions, and ultimately to the National Finals in Washington, DC. The winner receives a $20,000 scholarship.

Gioia also re-energized the NEA Jazz Masters, which is the nation's highest honor in jazz music, in order to raise the visibility of artists who he felt were undervalued in their own country.

Gioia's term as NEA Chairman coincided with the peak of U.S. involvement in the wars in Iraq and Afghanistan. During that time, Gioia worked to include the U.S. military and their families in NEA national initiatives. He expanded his "Shakespeare in American Communities" program to include tours to military bases. The NEA also sent young artist programs from opera companies around the country to military bases with the Great American Voices Military Base Tour. In 2004, Gioia launched Operation Homecoming: Writing the Wartime Experience, which collected writings from U.S. troops and their families about their wartime experiences in Afghanistan, Iraq, and stateside. Many of the writings were collected in the anthology Operation Homecoming. The anthology was named one of the "Best of 2006" non-fiction by The Washington Post. A documentary based on Operation Homecoming, produced by the Documentary Group, was nominated for a 2006 Academy Award.

Gioia stepped down from the NEA in January 2009 to return to poetry.

Five years after Gioia left office, The Washington Post referred to him as one of "two of the NEA's strongest leaders".

Gioia has written several collections of criticisms. In his 1991 essay "Can Poetry Matter?" Gioia objects to how marginalized poetry has become in America.

Gioia has written or co-written over two dozen literary anthologies and college textbooks, including An Introduction to Poetry (with X. J. Kennedy). He has also written many essays and reviews. He also wrote a column for San Francisco magazine as their music critic.

Personal life
On February 23, 1980, he and Mary Elizabeth Hiecke were married. They had three sons, one of whom died in infancy. His poem "Planting a Sequoia" is based on his experience of losing his infant son.

Literary output

Poetry
It was as a poet that Gioia first began to attract attention in the early 1980s, with appearances in The Hudson Review, Poetry, and The New Yorker. In the same period, he published a number of essays and book reviews.

Daily Horoscope (1986), his first collection, was one of the most anticipated and widely discussed poetry volumes of its time. Its contents range widely in form, length and theme. Among its more notable—and widely reprinted—pieces are "California Hills in August", "In Cheever Country", and "The Sunday News".

The Gods of Winter (1991), his second collection contains "Planting a Sequoia" about the tragic loss of his infant son, as well as the long dramatic monologues, "Counting the Children", in which an accountant has a disturbing interaction with a grotesque doll collection, and "The Homecoming", in which a murderer explains his motivations for returning home to commit one more murder. Simultaneously published in Britain, it was chosen as the main selection of the U.K. Poetry Book Society.

Interrogations at Noon (2001), Gioia's third collection, was the winner of the 2002 American Book Award. It includes both translation and many original poems in which contemplative and occasionally wistful notes predominate, as in the concluding stanza of "Summer Storm": "And memory insists on pining / For places it never went, / As if life would be happier / Just by being different." His poem "Words" explores the power and limits of language to understand the world. Many of the other poems examine the lives of poets, painters, and composers.

Pity the Beautiful (2012) marked Gioia's return to poetry after his term in public office as chairman of the NEA. As with his previous books of poetry, it featured both metrical verse and free verse. "Special Treatments Ward" garnered notice for its description of a pediatric cancer ward. "Haunted", the central poem in the collection, is a long dramatic monologue that is both love story and ghost story.

99 Poems: New & Selected (2016) collects his old poems along with several new poems. It was the winner of the 2018 Poets' Prize.

In December 2015, Gioia was named Poet Laureate of California. Gioia intended to visit each of the state's 58 counties and give a poetry reading. Gioia emphasized visiting smaller and mid-sized communities, saying,My life changed for the better by falling in love with poetry. It made me a better student, made me a more alert human being. And I'd like to try to bring the gifts of poetry to the broadest audience possible.

Music and opera
Gioia has collaborated with musicians including Ned Rorem, Lori Laitman, Morten Lauridsen, Paul Salerni, Alva Henderson, David Conte, Tom Cipullo, Stefania de Kenessey, and John Harbison. His jazz collaborators include Dave Brubeck, Paquito D'Rivera, and Helen Sung.

Gioia has written three opera libretti. His first opera, Nosferatu, with music by Alva Henderson, was jointly premiered by Rimrock Opera and Opera Idaho in 2004. His second libretto, Tony Caruso's Final Broadcast, with music by Paul Salerni, won the National Opera Association award for best new chamber opera and was premiered in Los Angeles in 2008. Both of these works have been recorded. His latest opera, The Three Feathers, with music by Lori Laitman, was premiered by Virginia Tech and Opera Roanoke in 2014.

Honors and awards 

In 2007, Gioia gave the commencement speech for his alma mater, Stanford University: National Public Radio included that speech on its list of "The Best Commencement Speeches, Ever", dating back to 1774.

Books

Poetry
 Daily Horoscope (1986)
 The Gods of Winter (1991)
 Interrogations at Noon (2001)
 Pity the Beautiful (2012)
 99 Poems: New & Selected (2016)
 Meet Me at the Lighthouse (2023)

Criticism
 Can Poetry Matter? (1991)
 Barrier of a Common Language: An American Looks at Contemporary British Poetry (Poets on Poetry) (2003)
 Disappearing Ink: Poetry at the End of Print Culture (2004)
 The Catholic Writer Today: And Other Essays (2019)
 Que reste-il-de la poésie ? (Can Poetry Matter ? translated by Renaud Toutlemonde), Paris, Allia, 2021, 64 p

Translation
 Eugenio Montale's Motteti: Poems of Love (translator) (1990)
 The Madness of Hercules (Hercules Furens) (translator). Included in Seneca: The Tragedies, Volume II, Johns Hopkins (1995)

Opera libretti
 Nosferatu (2001)
 Tony Caruso's Last Broadcast (2005)
 The Three Feathers (2014)

Edited
 "Poems from Italy" (editor, with William Jay Smith) (1985)
 New Italian Poets (editor, with Michael Palma) (1991)
 Certain Solitudes: On the Poetry of Donald Justice (editor, with William Logan) (1998)
 California Poetry: From the Gold Rush to the Present (California Legacy) (editor, with Chryss Yost and Jack Hicks) (2003)
 The Misread City: New Literary Los Angeles (editor, with Scott Timberg) (2003)
 Twentieth-Century American Poetry (editor, with David Mason and Meg Schoerke) (2004)
 "The Art of the Short Story" (editor, with R. S. Gwynn) (2006)
 An Introduction to Poetry, 13th edition(editor, with X.J. Kennedy) (2010)

Contributor
 My California: Journeys by Great Writers (contributor / 2004)
 This Man's Army: A War in Fifty-Odd Sonnets by John Allan Wyeth (introduction/2008)

Writings about Dana Gioia and his work
 Matthew Brennan. Dana Gioia. A Critical Introduction. (Story Line Press Critical Monographs) (2012)
 April Lindner. Dana Gioia (Boise State University Western Writers Series, No. 143) (2003)
 Jack W. C. Hagstrom and Bill Morgan. Dana Gioia: A Descriptive Bibliography with Critical Essays (2002)
 Janet McCann, "Dana Gioia: A Contemporary Metaphysics", Renascence 61.3 (Spring 2009): 193–205.
 Michael Peich. Dana Gioia and Fine Press Printing (Kelly/Winterton Press) (2000)

See also

 Nosferatu
 American poetry

Notes

References
 American Perspectives. C-SPAN. February 21, 2004. (Presentation of talk Gioia gave at the Agassi Theatre, Harvard University, February 9, 2004).
 Cynthia Haven. "Dana Gioia Goes to Washington". Commonweal. November 21, 2003.
 Cynthia Haven. "Poet Provocateur", Stanford Magazine, July/August 2000.
 Belinda Lanks. "Bush Picks Poet for NEA", ARTnews December 2002
 John J. Miller. "Up from Mapplethorpe". National Review. March 8, 2004.
 Jim Milliot. "Gioia vows to change America's reading habits". Publishers Weekly. June 27, 2005.
 "Reviving the Bard" (editorial). The New Criterion. December 2003.
 Bruce Weber. "Poet Brokers Truce in Culture Wars". The New York Times. September 7, 2004.
  World Authors 1990–1995. New York: H. W. Wilson, 1999

External links
 
 Dana Gioia official page
 
 Jack W. C. Hagstrom (AC 1955) Collection of Dana Gioia Bibliography Papers at the Amherst College Archives & Special Collections

1950 births
Living people
American Book Award winners
American critics
American magazine editors
American male non-fiction writers
American male poets
American poets of Italian descent
American poets of Mexican descent
American Roman Catholic poets
American writers of Italian descent
Catholics from California
English-language poets
Formalist poets
Harvard University alumni
Journalists from California
Laetare Medal recipients
National Endowment for the Arts
People from Hawthorne, California
Poets Laureate of California
Presidential Citizens Medal recipients
Sarah Lawrence College faculty
Stanford Graduate School of Business alumni
Wesleyan University faculty
Writers from Santa Rosa, California